Highway 355 is a highway in the Canadian province of Saskatchewan. It runs from the Sturgeon Lake First Nation, it transitions into Highway 788, to Highway 55 near Meath Park.

Highway 355 passes near the town of Albertville, and passes through the communities of Henribourg, Spruce Home (near its intersection with Highway 2), and Alingly.

References

355